Behnam Beyranvand is an Iranian footballer who plays forward for Aboomoslem of the Azadegan League.

Club career
Beyranvand joined Shahrdari Tabriz in 2010 after playing the previous season at Mes Rafsanjan in the Azadegan League.

 Assists

References

Year of birth missing (living people)
Living people
People from Khorramabad
Iranian footballers
Shahrdari Tabriz players
Rah Ahan players
Tarbiat Yazd players
Mes Rafsanjan players
Azadegan League players
Association football forwards